Winter Fantasy is an annual gaming convention that takes place in the USA every January or February.

History
The convention was held as early as 1977 under the name Winter Fantasy. In 2007 the convention was renamed to D&D Experience (often abbreviated as DDXP or D&DXP). In 2012 Wizards of the Coast announced it would now use the title D&D Experience for the events it held at the Gen Con convention. Baldman Games, the company currently operating this and other conventions for Wizards of the Coast, decided to continue the tradition and brought back the name Winter Fantasy for the 2013 convention.

The convention has been closely tied to the RPGA, and was sponsored by the RPGA from 1989 until TSR went bankrupt.

Winter Fantasy has played host to a wide variety of tournament and organized play games. These include popular living campaign programs such as Living City, Living Greyhawk, and Living Forgotten Realms. The 2013 convention included Pathfinder Society games run by Paizo Publishing in addition to Wizards of the Coast organized play events.

Winter Fantasy has often featured special events either not available elsewhere or with a limited release. 2013 included a special Pathfinder scenario and multi-table battle interactive events for the Living Forgotten Realms and Ashes of Athas campaigns. Ashes of Athas is a Dark Sun campaign, which started at Winter Fantasy 2011 and concluded at Winter Fantasy 2013.

The location of the convention has moved over the years. It is currently held in Fort Wayne, Indiana, a site it has held since 2009 and also several times in the past. The first Winter Fantasy was organized by Rob Kuntz and held January 8 to 9, 1977, at American Legion Hall in Lake Geneva, WI. Other locations have included Milwaukee (1992), Chicago, New Jersey (2004), and Washington, DC (2005-2008).

Timeline

Scheduled future events

References

External links 
 Winter Fantasy official site
 Wizards of the Coast reviews 2013 events

Gaming conventions